Alison Leslie Gold is an American author. Her books include Anne Frank Remembered, Clairvoyant: the Imagined Life of Lucia Joyce, The Devil's Mistress, and Memories of Anne Frank. She has written literary fiction as well as books for young people on a wide range of subjects including alcoholic intervention and the Holocaust as experienced by the young.  Her work has been translated into more than 25 languages.

Biography

Gold was born on July 13, 1945 in Brooklyn, New York, and grew up in New York City. She was educated at the University of North Carolina, Mexico City College and the New School for Social Research in New York City. She currently shares her time between New York City and a small island in Greece.

Gold has three siblings: poet Ted Greenwald, bed-and-breakfast owner Nancy Greenwald and film director Maggie Greenwald. Her son Thor Gold is a film-maker.

Writing 
Gold's books have been reviewed in The Times Literary Supplement, The Guardian, The New York Times, The New York Times Book Review, the Los Angeles Times, The Washington Post, the Chicago Tribune and O,The Oprah Magazine, among others.

Gold has described herself as a "salvager of other people's stories" and is most widely known for her work related to the Holocaust. Her book Anne Frank Remembered was co-written with Miep Gies, the employee of Otto Frank who hid Anne Frank and rescued Anne's diary.  Gold similarly worked with Anne Frank's childhood friend Hannah (Hanneli) Goslar to write Memories of Anne Frank: Reflections of a Childhood Friend. On the occasion of the publication of Anne Frank Remembered, Elie Wiesel said of Anne Frank Remembered: "Let us give recognition to Alison Gold. Without her and her talent of persuasion, without her writer's talent, too, this poignant account, vibrating with humanity, would not have been written." Isaac Bashevis Singer commended Ann Frank Remembered as "Beautifully written". Fiet's Vase, Gold's collection of Holocaust survival accounts, was described by one reviewer as having "language as transparent as pure water"; according to another reviewer, each story "reads like a miracle, a silver chalice excavated from dust."

Gold's non-Holocaust work has not been as consistently well received. For example, some critics did not like the blend of historical fact and fictional elements in The Clairvoyant, an "imagined history" of the life of Lucia Joyce, the daughter of James Joyce.  The Los Angeles Times observed that "so much is fabricated in Clairvoyant that anyone who reads it unaware of the real lives of James and Lucia Joyce will be led far off the mark". However, Irish author Padraic O'Farrell described Clairvoyant as "brilliantly innovative and movingly written". According The Times Literary Supplement, Gold's most recent work, the autobiographical Found and Lost, "captures the rough texture of lived experience in a way that often eludes more straightforward autobiography".

Recognition 
 Best of Best, American Library Association, 1987 (Anne Frank Remembered)
 Christopher Award, 1988 (Anne Frank Remembered)
 Nominated for National Book Award, 1997 (The Devil’s Mistress)

Adaptations 
 The Attic, television film adaptation of Anne Frank Remembered, 1988
 The Devil’s Mistress, one-woman stage show, 2007
 Mi Ricordo Anne Frank (“My Friend Anne Frank”), Italian television film adaptation of Memories of Anne Frank, Reflections of a Childhood Friend, 2009
 Mijn beste vriendin Anne Frank (“My Best Friend Anne Frank”), Dutch film adaptation of Memories of Anne Frank, Reflections of a Childhood Friend, 2021

Bibliography

Adult non-fiction
Anne Frank Remembered: The Story of the Woman Who Helped Hide the Frank Family (co-written with Miep Gies), 1987 (Special edition with new material, including new photographs, issued in 2009.)  Also translated into 23 languages, including Chinese, Japanese and Korean
Fiet's Vase and Other Stories of Survival, Europe 1939-1945, 2003, also translated into Slovenian
Love in the Second Act, True Stories of Romance, Midlife and Beyond, 2006
The Potato Eater, 2015 (novella)
Found and Lost: Mittens, Miep, and Shovelfuls of Dirt, 2017,

Adult fiction 
Clairvoyant, the Imagined Life of Lucia Joyce, 1992
The Devil's Mistress, the Story of the Woman Who Lived and Died with Hitler, 1997, also translated into Greek, Hungarian and Romanian
The Woman Who Brought Matisse Back from the Dead, 2014
Not Not a Jew, 2016 (novella)
Ransom Notes, 2022

Young adult 
Memories of Anne Frank, Reflections of a Childhood Friend, 1997, also translated into 22 languages
A Special Fate, Chiune Sugihara, Hero of the Holocaust, 2000
Elephant in the Living Room (co-written with Darin Elliott), 2014

References

External links

1945 births
Living people
American women novelists
Writers from Manhattan
People from Bayside, Queens
American women non-fiction writers
Novelists from New York (state)
20th-century American novelists
20th-century American non-fiction writers
20th-century American women writers
21st-century American novelists
21st-century American non-fiction writers
21st-century American women writers
Mexico City College alumni
University of North Carolina alumni
The New School alumni